Chachaura Binaganj railway station is a railway station in Guna district, Madhya Pradesh. Its code is CBK. It serves Chachaura-Binaganj town. The station consists of one platform. It lacks many facilities including water and sanitation. Passenger, Express, and Superfast trains halt here.

Trains

The following trains halt at Chachaura Binaganj railway station in both directions:

 Ratlam–Bhind Express
 Indore–Kota Intercity Express
 Ahmedabad–Darbhanga Sabarmati Express
 Sabarmati Express
 Indore–Dehradun Express
 Jhansi–Bandra Terminus Express

References

Railway stations in Guna district
Bhopal railway division